Politekhinik Kyiv was an ice hockey team in Kyiv, Ukraine. It is a hockey team of the Kyiv Polytechnic Institute (KPI).

They participated in the Ukrainian Hockey Championship from 1992 to 2005.

External links
Team profile on eurohockey.com

Ice hockey teams in Ukraine
Sport in Kyiv
Igor Sikorsky Kyiv Polytechnic Institute
College sports teams in Ukraine